Jean Barrett (born May 24, 1951) is a former American football offensive lineman who played for the San Francisco 49ers in the National Football League. He graduated W. T. White High School in Dallas, Texas, and played college football at the University of Tulsa.

1951 births
Living people
American football offensive linemen
San Francisco 49ers players
Tulsa Golden Hurricane football players
Players of American football from Fort Worth, Texas
Players of American football from Dallas
W. T. White High School alumni